Eastlake High School can refer to:

Eastlake High School (Chula Vista, California)
Eastlake High School (Sammamish, Washington)

See also:
East Lake High School (Tarpon Springs, Florida)